Geoffrey Didace Lembet (born 23 September 1988) is a professional footballer who plays for French club Sedan as a goalkeeper. Born in France, he represents Central African Republic at international level.

Career
Born in Villeneuve-Saint-Georges, Lembet has played club football for Viry-Châtillon, Sedan B, Sedan, Auxerre B, Auxerre, Red Star, Stade Laval and Stade Laval B.

He made his international debut for Central African Republic in 2010.

References

1988 births
Living people
Sportspeople from Villeneuve-Saint-Georges
French footballers
French sportspeople of Central African Republic descent
Citizens of the Central African Republic through descent
Central African Republic footballers
Central African Republic international footballers
ES Viry-Châtillon players
CS Sedan Ardennes players
AJ Auxerre players
Red Star F.C. players
Stade Lavallois players
Ligue 2 players
Association football goalkeepers
Footballers from Val-de-Marne